Bakemono no e (化物之繪, "Illustrations of Supernatural Creatures"), also known by its alternate title Bakemonozukushie (化物尽繪, "Illustrated Index of Supernatural Creatures"), is a Japanese handscroll of the Edo period depicting 35 bakemono from Japanese folklore. The figures are hand-painted on paper in vivid pigments with accents in gold pigment. Each bakemono is labeled with its name in hand-brushed ink. There is no other writing on the scroll, no colophon, and no artist's signature or seal.

Provenance 
Bakemono no e is held by the L. Tom Perry Special Collections of the Harold B. Lee Library at Brigham Young University in Provo, Utah, US and is part of the Harry F. Bruning Collection of Japanese rare books and manuscripts. It is thought that Harry F. Bruning (1886–1975) acquired the scroll from Charles E. Tuttle (1915–1993). Bakemono no e is thought to have been produced in the late 17th or early 18th century. Most of the bakemono illustrated are also found in other scrolls and books of the Edo period, with a few exceptions.

Scholarly interest 

The scroll came to the attention of Japanese scholars and the famous manga artist Shigeru Mizuki (1922–2015) in 2007 when digital images of the scroll were shared with Kōichi Yumoto (:ja:湯本豪一), then curator at the Kawasaki City Museum (:ja:川崎市市民ミュージアム). Yumoto was surprised to find an image of a three-eyed bakemono clearly labeled "Nurikabe" in the BYU scroll that matched an unlabeled illustration of the same figure in a scroll Yumoto owns. The Nurikabe image later became the topic of scholarly debate in Japan.

Bakemono list 
The following is a list of bakemono featured in Bakemono no e, along with their backgrounds.

References

External links 
Bakemono no e at Brigham Young University Harold B. Lee Library
Bakemono no e at Archive.org
Bakemono no e at The Ten Thousand Rooms Project

Japanese folklore
Japanese painting
Brigham Young University
Harold B. Lee Library-related rare books articles